The 1994 California lieutenant gubernatorial election occurred on November 8, 1994. The primary elections took place on March 8, 1994. State Controller Gray Davis, the Democratic nominee, decisively defeated the Republican nominee, State Senator Cathie Wright, to succeed incumbent Leo T. McCarthy, who was retiring after three terms.

Primary results
Final results from the Secretary of State of California

Democratic

Republican

Green

Others

General election results
Final results from the Secretary of State of California.

Results by county

See also
California state elections, 1994
State of California
Lieutenant Governor of California
List of Lieutenant Governors of California

References

External links
VoteCircle.com Non-partisan resources & vote sharing network for Californians
Information on the elections from California's Secretary of State 

1994 California elections
California
1994